This is a ' list of entrepreneurs by century. An entrepreneur is an owner or manager of a business enterprise who makes money through risk and initiative. This list includes notable entrepreneurs.

<18th-century entrepreneurs

 Regina Basilier (1572-1631), Swedish-German banker, trader and investor
 Birgitta Durell (1619-1683), Dutch-Swedish manufacturer-industrialist
 Louis De Geer (1587–1652), Walloon-born Dutch-Swedish businessman and industrialist; active mainly in the Dutch Republic and Sweden
 Isaac Le Maire (ca.1558-1624), Walloon-born Dutch businessman and investor; active mainly in the Dutch Republic
 Johan Palmstruch (1611-1671), Latvian-born Dutch-Swedish businessman, investor, and financial innovator; active mainly in the Dutch Republic and Sweden
 Pierre-Paul Riquet (1609-1680), French entrepreneur, creator of the Canal du Midi

18th-century entrepreneurs 

 Anna Elisabeth Baer 1878-1955 (shipping business), Finland
 Samuel Crompton 1753-1827 (spinning mule), Great Britain
 Caroline Gother 1761-1836 (banking), Sweden
 Johns Hopkins 1795-1873 (personal business), U.S.
 Anna Lohe 1654-1731 (banking business), Sweden
 Thomas Newcomen 1664-1729 (steam engine), Great Britain
 Charlotta Richardy 1751-1831 (manufacture), Sweden 
 Brigitta Sahlgren 1694-1771 (sugar), Sweden
 James Watt 1736-1819 (tugboats), Great Britain

19th-century entrepreneurs 

 John Jacob Astor (real estate), U.S.
 Augusta Björkenstam (transportation), Sweden
 Andrew Carnegie (steel), Pittsburgh, U.S. and Scotland
 James Buchanan Duke (tobacco), U.S.
 Thomas Alva Edison (film, telecommunication, technology, scientific research, energy), U.S.
 Charles T. Hinde (shipping, railroads, hotels), U.S.
 Quah Beng Kee (Ferry, Shipping), Penang, Malaysia
 Biddy Mason (real estate), California, U.S.
 J. P. Morgan (finance), U.S.
 Antoinette Nording (perfume), Sweden
 John D. Rockefeller (oil), U.S.
 Joseph Seligman (banking), U.S.
 Eugene Sharrer (plantations, retail, river steamers), Nyasaland (present-day Malawi)
 Claus Spreckels (sugar industry), Germany
 Leland Stanford (railroads), California, U.S.
 Levi Strauss (retail), U.S./Germany
 Jamsetji Tata (shipping, steel industry, hotels, education), India
 Nikola Tesla (AC induction motor), U.S., Yugoslavia (born in Austro-Hungarian Empire)
 Alessandro Torlonia (banking), Italy
 Richard Trevithick (mining and steam engines), Great Britain
 Cornelius Vanderbilt (railroads), U.S.
 George Westinghouse (railroad braking, switching, and signalling systems; commercialization of natural gas; development, transmission and application of AC electricity), U.S.

20th-century entrepreneurs 

 Agha Hasan Abedi (banking), Pakistan
 Paul Allen (computers, scientific research, real estate, media, education, entertainment, artificial intelligence, space, philanthropy), U.S.
 Dhirubhai Ambani (reliance industries), India
 Mary Kay Ash (cosmetics), U.S.
 Bang Si-hyuk (music), South Korea
 Otto Beisheim (retail), Germany
 William Boeing (aviation), U.S.
 Richard Branson (media, transportation, space), UK
 Coco Chanel (fashion), France
 Michael Dell (computers), U.S.
 Richard M. DeVos, Sr. (multi-level marketing), U.S.
 Walt Disney (animation), U.S.
 Larry Ellison (computers), U.S.
 Enzo Ferrari (sports cars), Italy
 Henry Ford (automobile manufacturing), U.S.
 Bill Gates (computers, philanthropy, investments) U.S.
 Henry Hu (technology), Hong Kong
 Howard Hughes (aviation, film), U.S.
 Steve Jobs (computers, technology, animation), U.S.
 Dean Kamen (technology), U.S.
 Ingvar Kamprad (retail), Sweden
 Vinod Khosla (technology), U.S.
 Ferruccio Lamborghini (sports cars), Italy
 Estée Lauder (cosmetics), U.S.
 Jorge Loring Martinez (aviation), Spain
 Vijay Mallya (breweries), India
 Terry Matthews (technology), Canada
 Kiran Mazumdar-Shaw (biotechnology), India
 Vince McMahon (entertainment media), U.S.
 Sunil Mittal (telecommunication), India
 N. R. Narayana Murthy (information technology), India
 Louis Odumegwu Ojukwu (transportation, manufacturing), Nigeria
 Anita Roddick (retail), UK
 Michael J. Saylor (Internet), U.S.
 Magnús Scheving (entertainment, health), Iceland
 Carlos Slim (telecommunications), Mexico
 Alan Sugar (technology), UK
 J. R. D. Tata (steel, aviation, information technology, transportation, cosmetics, consumer products, education), France/India
 Ted Turner (entertainment media), U.S.
 Madam C.J. Walker (retail, philanthropy), U.S.
 Sam M. Walton (retail), US
 Oprah Winfrey (entertainment), U.S.
 Steve Wozniak (computers, technology, education, philanthropy), U.S.
 George Lucas  (entertainment), U.S.

21st-century entrepreneurs 

Annisul Huq (Business and television)
Brian Acton (Internet), U.S.
 Ritesh Agarwal (Internet), India
 Bhavish Aggarwal (Internet), India
 Charles T. Akre (securities), U.S.
 Folorunso Alakija (fashion, oil and gas), Nigeria
 Rod Aldridge (business process outsourcing, education), UK
 Pierre Andurand (investments), France
 Trishneet Arora (Cyber Security), India
 Sachin Bansal (Internet), India
 Eike Batista (mining, oil and gas exploration), Brazil
 Steve Baxter (Internet), Australia
 David Benaron (digital health), U.S.
 Jeff Bezos (Internet, space), U.S.
 Constantin Bisanz (Investor), U.S.
 Joe Blackman (events, entertainment), UK/U.S.
 Ryan Blair (multi-level marketing), U.S.
 Sara Blakely (retail), U.S.
 Hernán Botbol (Internet), Argentina
 Sergey Brin (Internet), U.S.
 Tory Burch (retail), U.S.
 Malcolm CasSelle (Internet), U.S./China
 Lee Chambers (psychologist) (healthcare), UK
 Sean Combs (music and entertainment), U.S.
 Nancy Cruickshank (Internet), UK
 Mark Cuban (Internet), U.S.
 Nick D'Aloisio (Internet), UK
 Aliko Dangote (manufacturing, real estate, oil and gas), Nigeria
 Jack Dorsey (Internet), U.S.
 Helmy Eltoukhy (genomics), U.S.
 Shawn Fanning (Internet), U.S.
 Rihanna (cosmetics), Barbados
 Jon Fisher (Internet), U.S.
 Peter Gilgan (construction), Canada
 Vishal Gondal (video gaming), India
 Reid Hoffman (Internet), U.S.
 Drew Houston (Internet), U.S.
 Arianna Huffington (Internet), U.S.
 Steve Huffman (Internet), U.S.
 Jessica Huie (greeting cards), UK
 Mohammed Ibrahim (telecommunication), Sudan
 Daymond John (clothing), U.S.
 Lisa S. Jones (technology), U.S.
 Elle Kaplan (finance), U.S.
 David Karp (Internet), U.S.
 Sal Khan (education), U.S.
 Jin Koh (entrepreneur), U.S.
 Jan Koum (Internet), U.S.
 Jeremy Levitt (Internet), Australia
 Jack Ma (Internet), China
 Ana Maiques (healthcare), Spain
 Fadi Makki (trade), Middle East (Lebanon, Qatar)
 Strive Masiyiwa (telecommunication), Zimbabwe
 Rudy A. Mazzocchi (healthcare), U.S.
 Javier Moll (media), Spain/Australia
 Dave Morin (Internet), U.S.
 Rupert Murdoch (media, entertainment), UK/U.S.
 Elon Musk (Internet, space, energy, neurotechnology, transportation, infrastructure, artificial intelligence, electric cars), U.S./South Africa
 Carrie Rose (Internet), UK
Andrew Nisbet (catering), UK
 Phiwa Nkambule (Internet), South Africa
 Alexis Ohanian (Internet), U.S.
 Larry Page (Internet), U.S.
 Sean Parker (Internet), U.S.
 Melanie Perkins (Internet), Australia
 Stefano Pessina (healthcare), Italy
 Michelle Phan (Internet), U.S.
 Manny Phesto (music, cannabis/CBD), U.S.
 Azim Premji (information technology services), India
 Kelsey Ramsden (construction, children's toys), Canada
 Burton Rocks (Internet), U.S.
 Kevin Rose (Internet), U.S.
 Vijay Shekhar Sharma (Internet), India
 Param Singh (Internet, property), UK
 Lane Sutton (Internet), U.S.
 Kevin Systrom (Internet), U.S.
 Rodrigo Teijeiro (Internet), Argentina/Brazil
 Tânia Tomé (Consultancy, Investment & training), Mozambique
 Wang Jianlin (real estate development), China
 Emily Weiss (beauty), U.S.
 Anne Wojcicki (personal genomics), U.S.
 Wu Yajun (property developer), China
 Malala YoU.S.fzai (education), Pakistan
 Mark Zuckerberg (Internet), U.S.
 Dylan Field (Software), U.S.

See also 

List of Brazilian entrepreneurs
List of Indian entrepreneurs
List of Indonesians
List of Internet entrepreneurs
List of Japanese entrepreneurs
List of Nigerian entrepreneurs
List of social entrepreneurs
List of Swedish entrepreneurs
List of Turkish entrepreneurs
List of Zambian entrepreneurs

References

Entrepreneurship
Entrepreneurs